Leslie Smith (16 November 1921 – 1993) was an English professional footballer who played in the Football League for Mansfield Town.

References

1921 births
1993 deaths
English footballers
Association football defenders
English Football League players
Mansfield Town F.C. players
Nottingham Forest F.C. players
Ilkeston Town F.C. (1945) players